Naples Central School District is a school district in Naples, New York, United States. The superintendent is Matthew Frahm. The district operates two schools: Naples Junior Senior High School and Naples Elementary School. The District offices are located 136 North Main Street. The current Superintendent is Matthew Frahm.

Naples Junior/Senior High School 

Naples Junior/Senior High School is located at 136 North Main Street and serves grades 7 through 12. The current principal is Mrs. Nicole Green.

History 
Naples Junior/Senior High School was constructed in 1880. It was named "Naples Academy" and served grades K-12. Eventually, it split into a 7-12 school while younger students attended the elementary school.

Former alumni 
Meghan Musnicki–Olympic Gold Medalist in Rowing

Naples Elementary School 

Naples Elementary School is located at 2 Academy Street and serves grades K through 6. The current principal is Kristina Saucke.

References

External links
Official site

School districts in New York (state)
Education in Ontario County, New York